Maschinenfabrik Berthold Hermle AG is a publicly traded German company with headquarters in Gosheim, Baden-Württemberg, Germany. It is one of the leading manufacturers of milling machines. There are over 20,000 Hermle-manufactured machines in use worldwide. The chief users are suppliers of medical technology, the optical industry, aviation, and the automotive industry and racing.

Most development and manufacturing is located in Gosheim. The universal milling machines and machining centers from Hermle are used to produce tools, molds, and production parts.

History
In 1938 Berthold Hermle founded Berthold Hermle Gosheim - Schraubenfabrik and Fassondreherei. In 1957 the company began production of milling machines. Hermle went public in 1990 and changed its name to Maschinenfabrik Berthold Hermle AG—previously, it was primarily known by its initials of BHG (for Berthold Hermle Gosheim).

External links
 Berthold Hermle AG - official website

References 

Companies based in Baden-Württemberg